The Bao-Cheng Enterprise Tower is a skyscraper office building located in Cianjhen District, Kaohsiung, Taiwan. Construction of the building began in 1988 and it was completed in 1991, making it one of the earliest skyscrapers in Kaohsiung. It houses the corporate headquarters of Pou Chen Corporation.

See also 
 List of tallest buildings in Taiwan
 List of tallest buildings in Kaohsiung
 Pou Chen Corporation

References

1991 establishments in Taiwan
Skyscraper office buildings in Kaohsiung
Buildings and structures in Kaohsiung
Office buildings completed in 1991